Bela beatriceae (formerly Brachycythara beatriceae) is a species of sea snail, a marine gastropod mollusk in the family Mangeliidae.

Description
The length of the shell attains 7 mm.

Distribution
This species occurs in the Alboran Sea, part of the Mediterranean Sea  and in tropical West African waters.

References

  Mariottini P., Smriglio C., Calascibetta A. & di Giulio A. (2012) Taxonomic remarks on Bela atlantidea (Mollusca: Gastropoda: Mangeliidae) and updated distribution in the Mediterranean basin. Marine Biodiversity Records 5: e120

External links
 

beatriceae